Fidai Khan Koka (real name Muzaffar Hussain), was foster brother (Koka is suffix for foster brother), Governor of Awadh, Lahore and master of ordnance of the Mughal Emperor Aurangzeb. He is credited with leading construction on the Persian Gardens known as Pinjore Gardens near Chandigarh – the post-partition capital of Punjab – as well as building Teele Wali Masjid (1658–1660) of Lucknow, India and Badshahi Mosque (1671–1673) of Lahore.

Legacy
Pinjore Garden was built during the early days of Aurangzeb's rule, however, the exact dates of completion are not known. Since the time of Shah Jahan, Mughals reserved the pavilions with Balustered columns supporting the cusped arches only for the use of the Shahanshah and his immediate family, hence, it was likely built for Aurangzeb's personal use as summer retreat.

Gallery

External links
Summary description of the garden, history, architecture

See also
 Badshahi Mosque

References

Mujaddid
1618 births
1707 deaths
Mughal nobility
People from Dahod district
17th-century Indian monarchs
18th-century Indian monarchs